Pit or PIT may refer to:

Structure

 Ball pit, a recreation structure
 Casino pit, the part of a casino which holds gaming tables
 Trapping pit, pits used for hunting
 Pit (motor racing), an area of a racetrack where pit stops are conducted
 Trading pit, a part of a trading floor where open outcry takes place
 Pit cave, a natural cave containing a vertical shaft 
 Mine (mining)
 Open-pit mine, surface extraction of rock or minerals
 Coal mine or pit

Science and technology
 Pit, an excavation on metallic surface caused by pitting corrosion
 Pit, one of many indentations used to store data on a compact disc
 Pit, a seed inside a fruit; for example a cherry pit
 Pit (nuclear weapon), the core of an implosion weapon
 Powered industrial truck, a US legal term
 Programmable interval timer, a computing device
 Pulsed inductive thruster, a device used in spacecraft propulsion
 Pit (botany), a part of plant cell walls which allows the exchange of fluids
 Pyrena, the hard seed-bearing kernel inside drupe fruits such as peaches and olives
 Probability integral transform, a theorem in probability and statistics
 Boolean prime ideal theorem, which guarantees the existence of certain types of subsets in a given abstract algebra
 Pit bull, a breed of dog
 2-Propanoyl-3-(4-isopropylphenyl)-tropane, a cocaine analog
 As a file extension, .pit stands for Partition Information Table

Arts and entertainment

Games
 Pit (game), a Parker Brothers card game simulating a commodities exchange
 Pit (Kid Icarus), the main character in the video game series Kid Icarus
 Pits (card game), a card game similar to whist and rummy

Music
 Front ensemble, the stationary percussion section in a marching band or drum corps
 Mosh pit, an area for dancing at a concert
 Orchestra pit, the area in a theater, between the stage and audience, in which musicians perform

Places

United States
 Pit River, a watershed in California
 Peoples Improv Theater, a venue in New York City
 Pittsburgh (abbreviation), a city in Pennsylvania
 Pittsburgh International Airport (IATA code)
PIT Solutions, an Indian IT company

Sports
An abbreviation for Pittsburgh sports teams, such as:
Pittsburgh Steelers, a football team in the NFL
Pittsburgh Pirates, a baseball team in the MLB
Pittsburgh Penguins, a hockey team in the NHL
Pittsburgh Condors, a former basketball team in the NBA

Other uses
 Party of Independence and Labour, a Senegalese political party
 PIT maneuver, a ramming tactic used by law enforcement in vehicle pursuits
 Pit Martin (1943–2008), Canadian National Hockey League player

See also
 Bolshoy Pit, a tributary of the Yenisei, Russia
 Pituitary-specific positive transcription factor 1 (PIT-1), a gene
 The Pit (disambiguation)
 Pitt (disambiguation)
 Pitts (disambiguation)
 Bottomless pit (disambiguation)
 Cockpit
 Hole (disambiguation)
 Fossa (disambiguation), (Latin for pit)